Looking For A Feeling You Never Knew You Needed is an album by American singer-songwriter and actor Val Emmich. It was released digitally on September 21, 2010.

Track listing
All lyrics written by Val Emmich; all music composed by Emmich, Ron Haney and Bart Shoudel, except where noted.
"Don't Wanna Go Home" – 3:34
"Sidekick" – 3:20
"Gone" – 4:03
"Next to Me" – 3:54
"E.S.T." (Emmich) – 4:26
"Change of Scenery" – 3:38
"Grown Up Man" – 3:50
"Resume" (Emmich) – 3:13
"Convince Me" (Emmich) – 3:26
"Come Clean" – 3:38
"Waiting for the End" – 3:51
"Call It Off" – 4:41
"Don't Wanna Go Home [Acoustic]" – 3:45
"Gone [Acoustic]" – 4:02
"E.S.T. [Acoustic]" (Emmich) – 4:15
"Rather Be Lonely [Studio Outtake]" (Emmich) – 3:15

References

2010 albums